Off-Broadway is a 1982 American play by Norman Krasna. 

The 1982 production was directed by Jose Ferrer.

Plot
Cathy, an actor, falls for David.

Original Cast
Jessica Allen
James McDonnell
Barrett Clark
Renee Roy

Reception
"It tries," said the New York Times.

References

1982 plays
Plays by Norman Krasna